Richard Henry Lee (January 20, 1732June 19, 1794) was an American statesman and Founding Father from Virginia, best known for the June 1776 Lee Resolution, the motion in the Second Continental Congress calling for the colonies' independence from Great Britain leading to the United States Declaration of Independence, which he signed. Lee also served a one-year term as the president of the Continental Congress, was a signatory to the Continental Association and the Articles of Confederation, and was a United States Senator from Virginia from 1789 to 1792, serving part of that time as the second president pro tempore of the upper house.

He was a member of the Lee family, a historically influential family in Virginia politics.

Early life and education
Lee was born in Westmoreland County, Virginia, to Colonel Thomas Lee and Hannah Harrison Ludwell Lee on January 20, 1732. He came from a line of military officers, diplomats, and legislators. His father was the governor of Virginia before his death in 1750. Lee spent most of his early life in Stratford, Virginia, at Stratford Hall. Here he was tutored and taught a variety of skills. To develop his political career, his father sent him around to neighboring planters with the intention for Lee to become associated with neighboring men of like prominence. In 1748, at 16, Lee left Virginia for Yorkshire, England, to complete his formal education at Queen Elizabeth Grammar School, Wakefield.  Both of his parents died in 1750. In 1753, after touring Europe, he returned to Virginia to help his brothers settle the estate his parents had left behind.

Career
In 1757, Lee was appointed justice of the peace of Westmoreland County. In 1758, he was elected to the Virginia House of Burgesses, where he met Patrick Henry. An early advocate of independence, Lee became one of the first to create Committees of Correspondence among the many independence-minded Americans in the various colonies. In 1766, almost ten years before the American Revolutionary War, Lee is credited with having authored the Westmoreland Resolution which was publicly signed by prominent landowners who met at Leedstown, Virginia, on February 27, 1766. Among the signers were three brothers and one close cousin of George Washington.

American Revolution
In August 1774, Lee was chosen as a delegate to the First Continental Congress in Philadelphia. In Lee's Resolution on June 7, 1776, during the Second Continental Congress, Lee put forth the motion to the Continental Congress to declare Independence from Great Britain, which read (in part):

Resolved: That these united colonies are, and of right ought to be, free and independent States, that they are absolved from all allegiance to the British crown, and that all political connection between them and the state of great Britain is, and ought to be, totally dissolved.

Lee had returned to Virginia by the time Congress voted on and adopted the Declaration of Independence, but he signed the document when he returned to Congress.

President of Congress
Lee was elected the sixth president of Congress under the Articles of Confederation on November 30, 1784, in the French Arms Tavern, Trenton, New Jersey. Congress convened on January 11, 1785, in the old New York City Hall, with Lee presiding until November 23, 1785. Although he was not paid a salary, his household expenses were covered in the amount of $12,203.13.

Lee abhorred the notion of imposing federal taxes and believed that continuing to borrow foreign money was imprudent. Throughout his term, he maintained that the states should relinquish their claims in the Northwest Territory, enabling the federal government to fund its obligations through land sales. He wrote to friend and colleague Samuel Adams:

I hope we shall shortly finish our plan for disposing of the western Lands to discharge the oppressive public debt created by the war & I think that if this source of revenue be rightly managed, that these republics may soon be discharged from that state of oppression and distress that an indebted people must invariably feel.

Debate began on the expansion of the Land Ordinance of 1784 and Thomas Jefferson's survey method; namely, "hundreds of ten geographical miles square, each mile containing 6086 and 4-10ths of a foot" and "sub-divided into lots of one mile square each, or 850 and 4-10ths of an acre" on April 14. On May 3, 1785, William Grayson of Virginia made a motion, seconded by James Monroe, to change "seven miles square" to "six miles square."

The Land Ordinance of 1785 passed on May 20, 1785, yet the federal government lacked the resources to manage the newly surveyed lands. Not only did Native Americans refuse to relinquish their hold on the platted territory, but much of the remaining land was occupied by squatters. With Congress unable to muster magistrates or troops to enforce the dollar-per-acre title fee, Lee's plan ultimately failed, although the survey system developed under the Land Ordinance of 1785 has endured.

Political offices
 Justice of the Peace for Westmoreland County, Virginia (1757)
 Virginia House of Burgesses (1758–1775)
 Member of the Continental Congress (1774–1779, 1784–1785, 1787)
 Virginia House of Delegates (1777, 1780, 1785)
 President of the Confederation Congress (November 30, 1784 – November 4, 1785)
 United States Senator from Virginia (March 4, 1789 – October 8, 1792)
 President pro tempore during the Second Congress (April 18 – October 8, 1792)

Personal life and family
Lee's mother Hannah Harrison Ludwell died in 1750. On December 5, 1757, he married Anne Aylett, daughter of William Aylett. Anne died on December 12, 1768. The couple had six children, four of whom survived infancy. Lee remarried in June or July 1769 to Anne (Gaskins) Pinckard. The couple had seven children, five of whom survived infancy.

Lee honored his brother, Francis Lightfoot Lee (another signer of the Articles of Confederation and the Declaration of Independence), by naming one of his sons after him.

Children with Anne Aylett:

William Lee (1750 - March 23, 1836)

William F. Lee (1758 - unknown)

Thomas Jesse Lee (October 20, 1758 - September 07, 1805)

Mary "Molly" Lee Washington (July 28, 1764 - November 02, 1795), who married Colonel William Augustine Washington, Sr.

Hannah Lee Washington (1765 - November 23, 1802), who married Corbin Washington

Thomas Lee (October 13, 1760 - unknown)

Ludwell Lee (October 13, 1760 - March 23, 1826)

Marybelle Lee (1768 - 1768)

Children with Anne Pinckard:

Anne "Nancy"  Lucinda Lee (December 1, 1770 - September 9, 1804), who married Charles Lee

Henrietta "Harriet"  Lee (December 10, 1773 - 1803), who married Richard Lee Turberville, and later William Moffitt

Sarah Caldwell Lee (November 27, 1775 - May 08, 1837)

Cassius Lee (August 18, 1779 - July 08, 1798)

Francis Lightfoot Lee (June 18, 1782 - April 13, 1850)

Unnamed child (1784 - 1784)

Unnamed child (1786 - 1786)

David Richard Lee (unknown birthdate)

Death and legacy
Lee died on June 19, 1794, at the age of 62. Schools in Rossmoor, California, and Glen Burnie, Maryland are named after him, and Richard Henry Lee School in Chicago is named in his honor. The World War II Liberty Ship  was named in his honor. The Chantilly Archaeological Site was listed on the National Register of Historic Places in 1971.

See also
 Memorial to the 56 Signers of the Declaration of Independence
 Federal Farmer

References

Further reading
 McGaughy, Kent J. Richard Henry Lee of Virginia: A Portrait of an American Revolutionary (Rowman & Littlefield Publishers, 2003).
 Selby, John E. "Richard Henry Lee, John Adams, and the Virginia Constitution of 1776." Virginia Magazine of History and Biography 84.4 (1976): 387–400. online
 Unger, Harlow Giles.  First Founding Father: Richard Henry Lee and the Call for Independence (2017) online review

Primary sources
 Lee, Richard Henry. The Letters of Richard Henry Lee: 1762-1778 (2 vol 1911–1914) online. also vol 2 online

External links

 
 President Richard Henry Lee
 Richard Henry Lee
 Biography by Rev. Charles A. Goodrich, 1856 
 Richard Henry Lee papers in the Manuscripts and Archives Division at The New York Public Library.
 
 Richard Henry Lee Bio
 

1732 births
1794 deaths
American people of English descent
American slave owners
Anti-Federalists
Continental Congressmen from Virginia
18th-century American politicians
House of Burgesses members
Musical theatre characters
People educated at Queen Elizabeth Grammar School, Wakefield
Presidents pro tempore of the United States Senate
Signers of the Articles of Confederation
Signers of the Continental Association
Signers of the United States Declaration of Independence
United States senators from Virginia
Lee family of Virginia
People from Westmoreland County, Virginia
Virginia colonial people
Founding Fathers of the United States